Adhar may refer to:

People
 Adhar Kumar Chatterji (1914–2001), Chief of the Naval Staff of the Indian Navy, first Indian Navy full admiral
 Adhar Sen (1855–1885), a disciple of the Indian mystic and yogi Ramakrishna
 Adhar, an alternative spelling of the Persian name Azar

Other uses 
 Aadhaar, an identity number issued by the Unique Identification Authority of India
 ādhār, an Arabic name for the month of March; see Arabic names of calendar months

See also 
 Adar, a month in the Hebrew calendar

Masculine given names

Indian masculine given names